= Orientation of Cats =

- Short story by Julio Cortázar
- Original title: Orientación de los gatos
- Translator: Gregory Rabassa
- Country: Argentina
- Language: Spanish

Publication
- Published in: We Love Glenda So Much
- Publication date: 1980
- Published in English: 1983

"Orientation of Cats" (Spanish: "Orientación de los gatos") is a short story contained in the collection We Love Glenda So Much written by the Argentinian writer Julio Cortázar and published in 1980. The story portrays the relationship between Alana, the narrator (Alana's husband of unknown name), and their cat Osiris. It touches topics such as jealousy, curiosity and love.

== Publication ==
"Orientation of Cats" was released as one of the pieces in Julio Cortázar's 1980 short story collection We Love Glenda So Much and Other Tales. The ten stories in the collection feature several themes, such as love, and are divided into three sections. The story "Orientation of Cats" was originally written to accompany an art exhibition by Juan Soriano in Mexico.

== Plot ==
The story begins with the description of the way Alana and Osiris look at the narrator and between each other. They observe with confidence and without duplicity. The narrator then shows signs of jealousy towards Osiris, he expresses how he is incapable of reaching complete happiness when his wife express love towards him due to the constant presence of the cat and complains about her inability to realize and assess the situation. Furthermore, he believes his love for his wife is also not complete. He is obstinate in the idea that Alana has more to her that what she is letting him know. There is a whole number of aspects of her personality that are unfamiliar to him and he wants to discover. At first, he decides to use music to try to discover her. He believed music helped her let go of that facade of superficial happiness and total honesty and left her naked to his eye. He felt that by doing this, he would be able to love her better, to be a better husband. He had given up trying to understand Osiris. But Alana was a work in progress. He decided to take her to an art gallery to attempt to decipher her further and deeper, as he was not pleased with what he had discovered. He was convinced there was still more of her to show. He shows confidence in his endeavor, as he was sure she would have never realized that his true intentions to take her to the gallery was not to look at art, but to get to know more about her. This time around he was pleased of what he was seeing. He felt for the first time she was truly opening to him and was enjoying the sight of his wife. He was ready to love her entirely. Love her for what she was, all of her. In a twist off fate, she steps in front of a painting portraying a cat identical to Osiris looking out of a window. At this moment, she broke up her ties with her husband and entered the painting, from which she and the cat stared at him.

== Characters ==
- Narrator: Observer, interested in deciphering Alana. He feels insecure about the knowledge he has about his wife.
- Alana: Enigmatic, unknown, unpredictable, dynamic. Breaks all the ties that tied her to her husband.
- Osiris (cat): Mysterious and impassive. The only one with access to all the faces of Alana's personality.

== Themes ==
The short story features several themes such as love, communication, the "unyielding desire for a totalizing romantic love", and the distance that can grow between partners via "mechanical habits and routines which has stultified their relationship". Scholars such as Peter Standish have noted that the word "mirar", or "look" in Spanish, is repeated several times in the first lines story and that the story focuses on a visual triangle between the narrator, Alana, and Osiris where the woman and cat look at the narrator with an openness that he is unable to reciprocate in the same way.
